The Full Moon Hotel was a proposed building in Baku, Azerbaijan on the western shore of the Caspian Sea. Hotel Full Moon's design originally appeared as a disc with rounded edges and a hole in one of the top corners, with aspects that appear radically different according to the angle it is seen from. The front aspect is reminiscent of a glass "Death Star" but from the side profile it looks much like any ordinary glass tower. The Full Moon Hotel was planned to counterpoint to the Aypara (Crescent Moon) Tower under construction around the bay in front of the Port Baku buildings adding to the 'new Dubai' feel of the city's 21st-century architecture.

However, now that the building's skeleton is nearing completion, it is clear that the original design has been abandoned in favour of something looking more like a giant lotus flower.

Design
Changing appearance depending on the view is reinforced by the cladding treatment the architect has selected. The front will have a glass diagrid while the back will be covered with hexagonal honeycombs shaped windows.

The hotel is linked via a zoomorphically shaped podium that snakes curvaceously around the boundaries of the site to two residential apartment blocks entitled Palace of Wind One and Palace of Wind Two.

References 

Hotels in Baku
2012 establishments in Azerbaijan